James Tuchet (or Touchet) may refer to:

 James Tuchet, 5th Baron Audley (1398–1459)
 James Tuchet, 7th Baron Audley (c. 1463–1497), forfeit 1497
 James Tuchet, 3rd Earl of Castlehaven (1617–1684)
 James Tuchet, 5th Earl of Castlehaven (?–1700)
 James Tuchet, 6th Earl of Castlehaven (?–1740)
 James Tuchet, 7th Earl of Castlehaven (1723–1769)